Mola Ram or Maula Ram (1743–1833) was an Indian painter, who originated the Garhwal branch of the Kangra school of painting. He was also a poet, historian and diplomat. Much research about him was done by Mukandi Lal.

Life and career
He was born in Srinagar (now in Uttarakhand) to Mangat Ram and Rami Devi and worked for the Garhwal Kingdom from 1777 until its annexation first by the Gorkhas in 1803 followed by the British Raj in 1815.

It is said that two miniature painters of the Mughal imperial court at Delhi, Sham Das and his son Har Das (or Kehar Das), accompanied Sulaiman Shikoh, the son of Dara Shikoh, when he escaped from his uncle Aurangzeb in 1658 and sought refuge from Prithvi Shah of the Garhwal Kingdom, which had its capital in Srinagar. The painters remained in Srinagar as the royal tasbirdar (picture-makers), and developed the Garhwal style of miniature painting. Mola Ram was one of their descendants. The inception of the Garhwal school of painting is also sometimes credited to him. His son Jwala Ram and grandson Atma Ram continued the tradition, but further descendants suspected a curse and gave up painting. However, one of his descendants, Tulsi (often confused with Tulsi Mistri, another contemporary painter) was also a painter.

Mola Ram worked during the times of Garhwal rulers Pradip Shah, Lalit Shah, Jayakrit Shah and Pradyumna Shah from 1777 to 1804. He continued to work for the development of art and literature during the period of the Gorkha rule (1803–15) and the British rule over Garhwal.

Mola Ram himself initially painted in the Mughal style until visiting Kangra, e.g. his painting Mastani is in the Mughal idiom, while his later paintings, e.g. Vasakasajja Nayika, are in the Garhwal style, and can be called Garhwali Paintings in true sense. Some of his paintings are signed.

He wrote the historical work Garhrajvansh Ka Itihas (History of the Garhwal royal dynasty) which is the only source of information about several Garhwal rulers. He starts with Shyam Shah and goes on to describe Dularam Shah, Mahipati Shah, Pritam Shah, Medini Shah, Lalit Shah, and Jayakrit Shah. He also wrote Ganika Natak or Garh Gita Sangram in 1800. Mola Ram himself played a part in politics, helping Jayakrit Shah obtain help from Raja Jagat Prakash of Sirmur to quell a rebellion at the battle of Karparoli.

Mola Ram wrote Garhrajvanshkavya, Ran Bahadur Chandrika, Shamsher-e-Jang Chandrika, Bakhtawar Yash Chandrika and others. When Kaji Bakhtawar Singh Basnyat reached Srinagar on 1867 V.S. (i.e. 1810 A.D.), Mola Ram described the Gorkhali administration since 1861 V.S. (i.e. 1804 A.D.). In appreciation of Mola Ram's works, Kaji Bakhtawar gave 61 gold sovereigns, a horse, a robe, some weapons and restored his jagir villages and daily allowances. Mola Ram dedicated Bakhtawar Yash Chandrika in praises of Kaji Bakhtawar Singh Basnyat. He also wrote about the past, present, and future of the Gorkhali administration in Kumaon and Garhwal, which had predicted the possible collapse of Gorkhali rule as mentioned in his another work Garhrajvanshkavya.

Mola Ram died in Srinagar in 1833.

Tribute 
A large collection of Mola Ram's paintings are preserved at the Hemwati Nandan Bahuguna Garhwal University Museum  in Srinagar, Uttarakhand. Some of his paintings can also be viewed at the Boston Museum, USA, at the Bharat Kala Bhawan in Varanasi, and at the Kastur Bhai Lal Bhai Sagrahaalaya, Ahmedabad.

Mukandi Lal wrote the book 'Garhwal Paintings' published by the Publications Division of Government of India in 1968 which traced the history of Garhwal school of painting showcasing Mola Ram's various paintings and sketches.

References

Bibliography

External links

 Mola Ram, Garhwal Paintings and Garhwal School of Painting
 The story of Mola Ram

Indian male painters
1743 births
1833 deaths
18th-century Indian painters
19th-century Indian painters
People from Uttarakhand
Painters from Uttarakhand
People from Pauri Garhwal district
19th-century Indian male artists